The men's 400 metres event  at the 1992 European Athletics Indoor Championships was held in Palasport di Genova on 28, 29 February and 1 March.

Medalists

Results

Heats
First 3 from each heat (Q) and the next 3 fastest (q) qualified for the semifinals.

Semifinals
First 3 from each semifinal qualified directly (Q) for the final.

Final

References

400 metres at the European Athletics Indoor Championships
400